Zephanie Odhene Liwag Dimaranan (born February 14, 2003), known mononymously as Zephanie, is a Filipino singer, actress and host. She is known as the winner of the first season of Idol Philippines. Dimaranan is dubbed as "This Generation's Pop Princess" in the country by various media outlets.

Zephanie was hailed as the "New Female Recording Artist of the Year" at the 12th PMPC Star Awards for Music and Singer of the Year in the first KUMU Livestreaming Awards. She joined the Himig 11th Edition as the interpreter of "Tinadhana Sa'Yo", which won MOR’s Choice and TFC’s Global Choice Awards. As of January 2022, she has surpassed 10 million all-time streams on Spotify. Her self-titled debut album “Zephanie” immediately hit No. 1 on iTunes Philippines upon release while all-tracks charted within the Top 100. 

Her song "Sabihin Mo Na Lang Kasi" was listed as one of the most successful songs released in 2020 by Star Music with a combined of over a million streams. She notably was one of the 12 winners to be chosen to join the Now United bootcamp in Abu Dhabi in September 2021. Dimaranan also performed a duet with Brian McFadden, member of Irish boy band Westlife during his concert in the Philippines.
She transferred to GMA Network on March 31, 2022, after two and a half years in ABS-CBN. Dimaranan is currently a member of All-Out Sundays''' segments Queendom and Super Champions.

Early life
Dimaranan was born and raised in Biñan, Laguna, third of five kids. She described her parents (her father is a pastor) as strict but according to her, she and her siblings learned so much from them. Before joining Idol Philippines, Dimaranan also joined The Voice Kids (season 2) in 2015 where she was eliminated in the Live Rounds and Tawag ng Tanghalan (season 2) in 2017 where she lost against the eventual champion Janine Berdin.

Career
Prior to Idol Philippines
In 2015, Zephanie started her career by joining the second season of The Voice Kids, where she was eliminated in the first week of the semifinals.

In 2015, The Voice Kids Season 2 released their album, composed of twelve songs sung by the Semi-finalists including Zephanie with the songs Flashlight and Saan Darating Ang Umaga.

Few years after, she started to do some cover songs on her YouTube Channel, one of which is 'Till I Met You, which had garnered more than a million hits since it was uploaded.

In 2018, she participated in the second season of Tawag ng Tanghalan, where she lost to Janine Berdin.

Idol Philippines
In May 2019, her audition on Idol Philippines was aired and immediately hit a million views on YouTube. Since then, her performances in the said TV show was one of the most viewed performances. During the last part of the Final Showdown, the 3 finalists sung their original songs, which were also released on Spotify including her song Pangarap Kong Pangarap Mo composed by record producer Jonathan Manalo. On July 28, 2019, she was hailed as the first grand winner of Idol Philippines after garnering 100 percent of the votes, earning a ₱2,000,000 cash prize, along with an all-expense trip to Taiwan, a house and lot from Camella Homes, and a contract with Star Music.

Post-Idol Philippines
2019
In August 2019, Zephanie was launched as a new regular performer of ASAP Natin 'To and eventually became part of an all-female vocal group named "J.E.Z", together with Janine Berdin and Elha Nympha.

On September 3, 2019, Zephanie's rendition of Ebe Dancel’s “Bawat Daan” in the TV series ‘The Killer Bride,’ was heard on the teaser trailer for the September 4 episode. The song was released on September 27 in all digital music platforms together with the duet version with Ebe Dancel.

On September 28, 2019, an episode about her life story was aired, titled "Contest". She was portrayed by Maris Racal, with Yesha Camile portraying the younger Zephanie.

On November 16 & 17, Zephanie joined former Westlife member Brian McFadden on his First Major Solo Concert in the Philippines called "Romantic Intimate Concert" at Waterfront Cebu and New Frontier Theater.

Few days after, Zephanie held her first major solo concert on November 28, 2019, at the New Frontier Theater,  with Sarah Geronimo, Elha Nympha, Idol Philippines Top 4 - Lance, Lucas, Dan and Miguel, Erik Santos and Regine Velasquez (Moira Dela Torre and Janine Berdin were originally supposed to be part of the concert's special guests, but pulled out due to health issues.) as her special guests. During the concert, "Pangako Ko", was released on YouTube as a digital single and it was later released on January 24, 2020, to streaming sites.

2020
On February 7, 2020, she released her first movie theme song "Simpleng Tao" originally sung by Gloc-9 for the movie "James and Pat and Dave". She released another single under Star Music "Sabihin Mo Na Lang Kasi" on July 24, 2020.

In March 2020, she was launched as one of the faces of Palmolive Naturals Shampoo along with Maine Mendoza.

On July 29, 2020, Zephanie debuted as the host together with Kyle Echarri as they launched their online music variety show entitled "CSTV Presents: Artist Lab", appearing on Cornerstone Entertainment’s Facebook Page with simultaneous streaming on their Official Facebook pages. The show was originally set to last for 4 consecutive weeks every Wednesday. However, the online show was suspended from August 4, 2020, after Metro Manila was placed under a modified Enhanced Community Quarantine for 2 weeks. The show returned on October 16, 2020, with a new timeslot every Fridays instead of Wednesdays. The resumed season lasted until November 6, 2020.

In October 2020, amidst the shutdown and franchise crisis of ABS-CBN in the middle of the COVID-19 pandemic, Zephanie became a part of "Sunday Noontime Live!", a Sunday noontime musical variety show which was produced by Brightlight Productions and Cornerstone Entertainment Studios that was aired on TV5 through a blocktime agreement between Brightlight and TV5. She was part of the segment entitled "Ultimate Vocal Showdown" with Fatima Louise Lagueras a.k.a Fana, Sassa Dagdag, Sam Mangubat and Niel Murillo of BoybandPH. The show only lasted for three months before it was cancelled on January 17, 2021, being replaced by a simulcast of ASAP Natin 'To on the said network's noontime timeslot.

She was launched as one of the 12 interpreters of Himig Handog 11th Edition with a song entitled "Tinadhana Sa'Yo", composed by SJ Gandia from the United States. The song was released on November 13, 2020, while its associated music video were released on January 2, 2021.

On October 26, 2020, she released a new single titled "Pasensya Na", an exclusive released under Cornerstone Music.

On November 6, 2020, Zephanie held her virtual concert titled Zuperstar on Kumu, she was the first streamer that held a concert on the said online platform. She was also awarded as the Kumu Superstar Streamer.

2021
In February 2021, Zephanie returned to ABS-CBN following a 3-month stint under Brightlight Productions by appearing on It's Showtime's Hide N' Sing segment.

On March 7, 2021, Zephanie made her comeback to the ASAP stage after one year of not appearing on the said show, performing her Himig 11th Edition entry "Tinadhana Sa'yo". However, prior to her ASAP comeback, her group J.E.Z would be rebranded as the  after Sheena Belarmino joined the group. She later rejoined the aforementioned group after her comeback. The revived group officially debuted on April 25, 2021, with Zephanie representing the color green in the said group. However, her stint with the group was short-lived, as she was replaced in the August 2021 episodes following a temporary reshuffling of the group due to her absences, and did not return in the following episodes. 

In 2021, she interpreted a cover of Yeng Constantino's song titled "Lapit" as the themesong for the TV series Niña Niño, produced by Spring Films and Cornerstone Studios. The song would later be included in her first album. 
 
During the Himig 11th Edition Grand Finals, which was held on March 21, 2021, "Tinadhana Sa'Yo" won the MOR's Choice Award and TFC's Global Choice Award.

In August 2021, Dreamscape Entertainment announced the Official Soundtrack of the series "Marry Me, Marry You" which includes Zephanie's rendition of "One Day" originally sung by Angeline Quinto and it was digitally released on August 27, 2021. The said series aired its first episode on September 13.

On August 24, 2021, she was featured in another commercial of Palmolive Naturals Shampoo along with Julia Barretto and Angelina Cruz.

On August 31, 2021, it was revealed that Zephanie was among the 12 winners of the Camp Now United competition, and she flew to Abu Dhabi on September 15, 2021, to attend a bootcamp of the global pop group Now United. She, along with the other 10 bootcampers, underwent vocal training with Joseph Clarke and choreography training with Kyle Hanagami. Also, she would appear on the song "Good Days", an original song recorded for the bootcampers. She would also appear on a special performance of the group's single "Come Together" along with the other bootcampers and Now United themselves.  Following the 2-week stint in the bootcamp, she returned to the Philippines on September 30, 2021.

In October 2021, during the 12th PMPC Star Awards for Music, Zephanie won the New Female Recording Artist of the Year for her first single "Pangarap Kong Pangarap Mo".

On November 8, 2021, she was launched as one of the new generation artists of Cornerstone Entertainment through their Gen C launch event and renewed her contract with the said management.

In November 2021, Zephanie was featured in another Palmolive commercial along with Julia Montes, and would release a new commercial jingle titled .

In December 2021, she released a Christmas Song entitled "A Merry Merry Cheer", a collaboration with Singaporean music artist and producer, Zadon.

Also in the same month, she made her return to free TV by appearing on Atin Ang Paskong Ito, Kapatid!: The 2021 TV5 Christmas Celebration, in which, she performed "Lapit", the themesong of the network's TV series, Niña Niño.

2022: Transfer to GMA Network
In the first week of the year 2022, Zephanie finally released her self-titled debut album, which showcases her previously released singles and original songs with a carrier single “Magpakita Ka Na" composed by Miguel Mendoza III, the composer of the hit song Isa Pang Araw which she also has a rendition included on her album. It's music video was released on February 22.

On March 31, 2022, after two and a half years in ABS-CBN, Zephanie left the network and transferred to GMA and signed a contract with their talent agency Sparkle while remaining co-managed by Cornerstone Entertainment. She made her debut on All-Out Sundays on April 3, 2022, 8 months after her last ASAP appearance.

She also performed various theme songs of the said network's drama series. Her first was "Tunay Na Minamahal" from the 2022-hit afternoon prime series, Apoy sa Langit and "Kaagapay" from Bolera''.

She was also one of the 30 artists who performed in Mr. Music: The Hits of Jonathan Manalo, a concert held at the Newport Performing Arts Theater in Resorts World Manila (now Newport World Resorts Manila). During the concert, she performed her first single "Pangarap Kong Pangarap Mo" and "Pag-Ibig Na Kaya", which is a duet with Jeremy G.

TV performances

Filmography

Television

Discography

Albums

Singles

EPs

Chart performance

Concerts

Awards and nominations

References

External links 

 
 Cornerstone Entertainment profile
 Sparkle profile

2003 births
Living people
People from Biñan
Filipino television actresses
Filipino child actresses
GMA Network personalities
ABS-CBN personalities
Filipino women pop singers
21st-century Filipino women singers
Singers from Laguna (province)
Participants in Philippine reality television series
The Voice Kids (Philippine TV series) contestants
Tawag ng Tanghalan contestants
Idols (franchise) participants
Reality show winners
Filipino women television presenters
Filipino television variety show hosts
MCA Music Inc. (Philippines) artists
Star Music artists
GMA Music artists